The Singapore order of precedence is a nominal and symbolic hierarchy of important positions within the Government of Singapore. It has no legal standing but is used to dictate ceremonial protocol at events of a national nature. The official list was gazetted in 1967.

Order of precedence

References

Orders of precedence
Politics of Singapore